Willie Jones III (born June 8, 1968 in Los Angeles, California) is a jazz drummer. He has played, toured, and recorded with Horace Silver, Roy Hargrove, Hank Jones, Cedar Walton, and Herbie Hancock. He played on Arturo Sandoval's Grammy-winning album Hot House (1998).

Early life
Jones' father, also named Willie Jones, was a pianist, composer and arranger, who moved to Los Angeles from Jacksonville in 1961. By the time Jones was born, his father "was gigging locally and working as a vocal coach for entertainers, including Ann-Margret."

Willie Jones III was born on June 8, 1968, in Los Angeles. Jones reported that he wanted to be a jazz musician from the age of seven.

Later life and career
Jones was one of the founding members of the band Black Note in 1990. Members of this ensemble included, at various times, Ark Sano, Eric Reed, Gilbert Castellanos, James Mahone, Kenneth Crouch, Mark Shelby, and Richard E. Grant. They released several albums.

In 1991, Jones began studying at the California Institute of the Arts, where he took drum lessons from Albert "Tootie" Heath. Jones played with Milt Jackson in 1994, and toured with trumpeter Arturo Sandoval from 1994 to 1998.

Jones was based in Los Angeles until he moved to New York in 1997. He played in trumpeter Roy Hargrove's quintet from 1998 to 2006.

In 2000, Jones founded an independent jazz label, WJ3 Records. He said in 2017 that "It's a self-investment, [...] I'm not making a profit, but I'm not losing any money. I've become more proficient at putting out each project." He has regularly played with pianist Eric Reed, as the drummer for Wynton Marsalis' Jazz at Lincoln Center, and has several CDs released as a leader on his own label, playing hard bop and swing.

Jones has taught at Northwestern University since 2010.

In 2014, Jones filed a lawsuit against California rapper Kendrick Lamar for allegedly sampling "The Thorn" illegally in Lamar's song "Rigamortus".

Playing style
Guitarist Russell Malone commented in 2017 that, "Some drummers can't get through two bars of music without trying to do something cute and slick, but with Willie, the time and the groove is not an afterthought. He's aware of each component of the song – the melody, the changes and the form. I like to incorporate different grooves into my things, and Willie does not turn up his nose at them. He knows exactly what to do."

Discography
An asterisk (*) indicates that the year is that of release.

As leader/co-leader

As sideman

References 

1968 births
American jazz drummers
Post-bop drummers
Living people
20th-century American drummers
American male drummers
20th-century American male musicians
American male jazz musicians
Black Note members
WJ3 Records artists